The Princess of Park Row is a lost 1917 silent film comedy drama directed by Ashley Miller with Mildred Manning and Wallace MacDonald in the leads.

Cast
Mildred Manning - Margot
Wallace MacDonald - Tom Kearney
William R. Dunn - Kronski (*William Dunn)
John Costello - Niclos
Ann Brody - Berta (*Anne Brody)
Lillian Walker - ?

References

External links
 The Princess of Park Row at IMDb.com

 lantern slide(Wayback Machine)

1917 films
Lost American films
American silent feature films
American black-and-white films
Vitagraph Studios films
1910s English-language films
1917 comedy-drama films
1917 lost films
Lost comedy-drama films
1910s American films
Silent American comedy-drama films